Snow Park may refer to:

 Snowpark, a terrain park for freestyle skiing or snow-boarding
 Snow Park, New Zealand, a skifield near Wanaka, New Zealand
 a park in Oakland, California